The videography of Lionel C. Martin consists of over 100 music video credits, as well as three feature film credits.

Films

Music videos

1984-1989

1990-1994

1995-1999

2000-2004

2005-2009

References

Director videographies